Nandita Gorlosa (born 13 May 1977) is an Indian politician from Assam who is serving as Minister for Power, Cooperation, Mines, Minerals, Indigenous and Tribal Faith and Culture Department in the Sarma Ministry since 2022. She is a member of the Bharatiya Janata Party.She represents the Haflong constituency in the Assam Legislative Assembly since 2021.

References 

Living people
Year of birth missing (living people)
21st-century Indian politicians
Bharatiya Janata Party politicians from Assam
Assam MLAs 2021–2026
Members of the Assam Legislative Assembly